The following lists events that happened during 1988 in Laos.

Incumbents
President: Souphanouvong 
Prime Minister: Kaysone Phomvihane

Events

February
19 February - A cease-fire is declared, ending the Thai–Laotian Border War.

Births
15 April - Lamnao Singto, footballer
12 August - Souksavanh Tonsacktheva, athlete

References

 
Years of the 20th century in Laos
Laos
1980s in Laos
Laos